The 2018–19 NHL Three Star Awards are the way the National Hockey League denotes its players of the week and players of the month of the 2018–19 season.

Weekly

Monthly

Rookie of the Month

References

Three Star Awards
Lists of NHL Three Star Awards